Stanley Nwabili is a Nigerian professional footballer who plays as a goalkeeper for Nigerian club Lobi Stars and the Nigeria national team.

Personal life 
Stanley was born on June 10, 1996.

Career 
In 2019, Stanley Nwabili joins Go Round FC, before later secure a move to Enyimba in 2020.

International career 
Stanley Nwabili earn his first cap for the Nigerian national team in an international friendly against Mexico in US.

Reference

External links
 

Living people
1996 births
Nigerian footballers
Nigeria international footballers
Association football goalkeepers